Gordon, Gordon Cycle & Motor Company Ltd was a British manufacturer of bicycles and motor cars in 1903 and 1904. It was established on the Seven Sisters Road, north London.

History
Gordon Cycle & Motor Company was established on the Seven Sisters Road, north London in 1903 and production ended in 1904.

Motorcars
The Gordon Miniature was a voiturette with a 6 hp single cylinder engine, two speed transmission and chain drive to the rear axle. It  weighed under 488 pounds and was priced at 125 guineas (£131.25).

In 1904 the car was enhanced with a 3 speed gearbox.

See also
 List of car manufacturers of the United Kingdom

References

Other sources
 Harald Linz, Halwart Schrader: Die Internationale Automobil-Enzyklopädie. United Soft Media Verlag, München 2008, . 
 George Nick Georgano (Chefredakteur): The Beaulieu Encyclopedia of the Automobile. Volume 2: G–O. Fitzroy Dearborn Publishers, Chicago 2001, . (englisch)
 David Culshaw, Peter Horrobin: The Complete Catalogue of British Cars 1895–1975. Veloce Publishing PLC, Dorchester 1997, . (englisch)

Defunct motor vehicle manufacturers of England
Cyclecars
Vehicle manufacture in London